The Nordenskiöld Glacier (lednik Nordenshel'da) is a group of four glaciers in Novaya Zemlya, Arkhangelsk Oblast, Russia. 

This glacier group was named after Arctic explorer Adolf Erik Nordenskiöld.

Geography 

The Nordenskiöld Glacier group is located on the eastern side of northern Severny Island of Novaya Zemlya. Flowing from the Severny Island ice cap, it is composed of four roughly north-south oriented tidewater glaciers:
 Vershinsky Glacier (Lednik Vershinskogo), the soutwesternmost
 Rozhdestvensky Glacier (Lednik Rozhdestvenskogo)
 Novopashenny Glacier (Lednik Novopashennogo), also known as Lednik Sredniy
 Roze Glacier (Lednik Roze), the northeasternmost

Their fronts have widths of over 3 km in average and their terminuses are in the Kara Sea between Cape Opasnyy and Cape Middendorff.

See also
List of glaciers in Europe
List of glaciers in Russia

Further reading
J. J. Zeeberg, Climate and Glacial History of the Novaya Zemlya Archipelago, Russian Arctic. Purdue University Press (January 1, 2002)

References

External links
Changes in glacier extent on north Novaya Zemlya

Glaciers of Russia
Novaya Zemlya